Brassica rapa is a plant species growing in various widely cultivated forms including the turnip (a root vegetable); napa cabbage, bomdong, bok choy, and rapini.

Brassica rapa subsp. oleifera is an oilseed which has many common names, including rape, field mustard, bird's rape, and keblock. The term rapeseed oil is a general term for oil from Brassica species. Food grade oil made from the seed is also called canola oil, while non-food oil is called colza oil. Canola oil is sourced three species of Brassica plants: Brassica rapa and Brassica napus are commonly grown in Canada, while Brassica juncea (brown mustard) is a minor crop for oil production.

History

The origin of B. rapa, both geographically and any surviving wild relatives, has been difficult to identify because it has been developed by humans into many types of vegetables, is now found in most parts of the world, and has returned to the wild many times as a feral plant. A study of genetic sequences from over 400 domesticated and feral B. rapa individuals, along with environmental modelling, has provided more information about the complex history. These indicate that the ancestral B. rapa probably originated 4000 to 6000 years ago in the Hindu Kush area of Central Asia, and had three sets of chromosomes. This provided the genetic potential for a diversity of form, flavour and growth requirements. Domestication has produced modern vegetables and oil-seed crops, all with two sets of chromosomes.

Oilseed subspecies (oleifera) of Brassica rapa may have been domesticated several times from the Mediterranean to India, starting as early as 2000 BC. Edible turnips were possibly first cultivated in northern Europe, and were an important food in ancient Rome. The turnip then spread east to China, and reached Japan by 700 AD. There are descriptions of B. rapa vegetables in Indian and Chinese documents from around 1000 BC.

In the 18th century, the turnip and the oilseed-producing variants were seen as being different species by Carl Linnaeus who named them B. rapa and B. campestris. Twentieth-century taxonomists found that the plants were cross fertile and thus belonged to the same species. Since the turnip had been named first by Linnaeus, the name Brassica rapa was adopted.

Uses
Many butterflies, including the small white, feed from and pollinate the B. rapa flowers.

The young leaves are considered an excellent leaf vegetable and can be eaten raw; older leaves are better cooked. The taproot and seeds can also be eaten raw, although the latter contains an oil which may cause irritation for some people.

Cultivars

References

External links 

PROTA (Plant Resources of Tropical Africa) database record on Brassica rapa L.

rapa
Leaf vegetables
Plants described in 1753
Taxa named by Carl Linnaeus
Root vegetables
Space-flown life